The ancient Egyptian noble Sitre In (or Sitra In, or Sit-re known as In or Inet, or simply Sitre) was buried in the Valley of the Kings, in tomb KV60. She has been identified as the nurse of Hatshepsut. A life-sized statue of her holding Hatshepsut is inscribed with her charge, which is repeated on an ostrakon now in Vienna. Although not a member of the royal family, she received the honour of a burial in the royal necropolis. Her coffin has the inscription wr šdt nfrw nswt In, identifying her as the Great Royal Wet Nurse In.

References

16th-century BC women
People of the Eighteenth Dynasty of Egypt
Wet nurses